Lake Singkarak is a lake in West Sumatra, Indonesia. It is located between the regencies of Tanah Datar and Solok Regency. It has an area of 107.8 km2, being approximately 21 km long and 7 km wide. The natural outlet for excess water is the Ombilin river which flows eastward to the Strait of Malacca. A hydroelectric project, however, has diverted most of the lake outflow to the Anai river which flows westward into the Indian Ocean near Padang. This Singkarak power station uses this water to generate power for the West Sumatra and Riau provinces. A species of fish called ikan bilih (Mystacoleucus padangensis) is endemic to the lake, and is harvested for human consumption. A railway line, which connects Padang and  Sawahlunto-Sijunjung, skirts the length of the lake on the eastern side.

See also
 List of lakes of Indonesia

Notes

References

Singkarak
Landforms of West Sumatra